Luigi Bianco was born 3 March 1960 is an Italian prelate of the Catholic Church who has spent his career in the diplomatic service of the Holy See. He has been an apostolic nuncio with the rank of archbishop since 2009.

Biography
Luigi Bianco was born 3 March 1960 at Montemagno, Italy. He was ordained a priest of the Diocese of Casale Monferrato on 30 March 1985. He earned a doctorate in canon law from the Pontifical Urban University in Rome.

He entered the diplomatic service of the Holy See on 1 July 1989. He served in the various Nunciatures, including in Italy, Egypt, Argentina, Croatia and Spain.

On 12 January 2009, he was appointed Apostolic Nuncio to Honduras and titular archbishop of Falerone. He was consecrated bishop on 25 April 2009 at Sant’Evasio Cathedral, Casale Monferrato, by Cardinal Tarcisio Bertone.

On 12 July 2014, he was appointed as Apostolic Nuncio to Ethiopia. On 10 September 2014, he was appointed Apostolic Nuncio to Djibouti and Apostolic Delegate to Somalia.

On 4 February 2019, he was appointed by Pope Francis, as Papal nuncio to Uganda. He took up office in Kampala, Uganda on Monday 8 April 2019.

Bianco speaks English, French, Italian and Spanish.

See also
 Roman Catholicism in Uganda
 List of heads of the diplomatic missions of the Holy See

References

External links

Archbishop Bianco Appointed New Apostolic Nuncio to Ethiopia As at 18 July 2014.

1960 births
Living people
People from Montemagno
21st-century Italian Roman Catholic titular archbishops
20th-century Italian titular bishops
Apostolic Nuncios to Honduras
Apostolic Nuncios to Ethiopia
Apostolic Nuncios to Uganda
Apostolic Nuncios to Djibouti
Apostolic Nuncios to Somalia